Dong-A University is a private university in Busan, South Korea. It is the only private university and one of two universities that has both a medical school and a law school in Busan, the second-largest city in South Korea.

Academics

The school's comprehensive undergraduate programs are provided through 12 faculties, covering fields from Physical Education, Natural Sciences, and Engineering to Social Sciences, Law, and Medicine. In addition to a general graduate school, there are eight specialized graduate schools: Northeast Asian Studies, Business Administration, Education, Industry, Mass Communications, Policy Sciences, Law and Police, and Arts.

The undergraduate and graduate academic programmes in archaeology, offered through the departments of Archaeology and Art History and the Dong-A University Museum, are the most well known in Korea.

History

In August 1947, the organization established for the creation of Dong-A College, along with Dr. Jae-hwan Jeong pen-named Sokdang as its leader, applied to the Ministry of Education for permission to establish the Dong-A Foundation. Permission was granted and the foundation opened Dong-A College as a four-year college on December 30, 1947 with five departments divided into two schools: School of Liberal Arts and Natural Sciences and School of Law. Departments such as History and English were founded in the mid-1950s. The Central Library was completed in 1957. At present, the university has 9 graduate schools and 11 colleges including 28 divisions and 13 departments with 55 majors.

The Dong-A University Museum was established in 1959.  As of 2007, its collection includes over 30,000 artifacts, among them 2 national treasures and 10 treasures. It has published over 75 archaeological reports and annually showcases new material at the joint exhibition sponsored by the Korean Association of University Museums.

Among the alumni are several ministers of the Korean government as well as leaders of major Korean companies.

Campuses 

Dong-A University has Seunghak, Gudeok, and Bumin campuses.

Seunghak Campus

The Seunghak Campus is on the slopes of Mt. Seunghak, where one can get a view of Ulsuk-do, an islet that is home to migratory birds near the mouth of the Nakdong River. With a total area of 704,917 m2, the Seunghak campus accommodates the offices of university administration and the offices of colleges such as the College of Humanities, the College of Natural Sciences, the College of Human Ecology, the College of Business Administration, the College of Natural Resources and Life Sciences, the College of Engineering, and the College of Physical Education. The Seunghak Campus is the location of four graduate schools: the Graduate School of Business Administration, Graduate School of Education, and Graduate School of Industrial Information, as well as 18 research institutes, and 18 subsidiary organizations.

Gudeok Campus

The Gudeok Campus is 20 minute from the other campuses and is found at the foot of Mt. Gudeok and Daeshin Citizens' Park. The campus is set beside the heavily forested entrance to Daeshin Citizen's Park. The land area of the campus is 45,542 m2. There are three colleges and two graduate schools here including the College of Social Sciences, College of Arts, College of Medicine, School of Mass Communication, and Graduate School of Social Welfare. Additionally, the Gudeok Campus hosts 7 subsidiary research institutes and 2 subsidiary organs. The Dong-A University Medical Center plays a leading medical role in research and treatment in Busan and Gyeongsangnam-do areas.

The Gudeok Campus contains some of the oldest buildings on the university, including the Dong-A University Museum building. The museum's exhibit halls were to move to the stately Old Law Courts building at the Bumin Campus and re-open in September 2007.

Bumin Campus

The Bumin Campus is in the central part of the old heart of Busan. This campus accommodates the College of Law, Graduate school of Law and Police, Graduate School of Northeast Asian Studies, and the Adult Continuing Education Centre. The Bumin Campus also houses research laboratories of the Dong-A University Museum.

Academic organization

Seunghak Campus
College of Humanities
College of Natural Sciences
College of Engineering
College of Natural Resources and Life Science
College of Health Sciences
College of Design and Environment
College of Arts and Sports
Division of Computer Engineering and Aritifical Intelligence

Gudeok Campus
College of Medicine
Division of Nursing

Bumin Campus
College of Business Administration
College of Social Sciences
College of SeokDang Honors
College of Global Business

Graduate school
Graduate School
Graduate School of Northeast Asian Studies
Graduate School of Business Administration
Graduate School of Education
Graduate School of Industrial Information
Graduate School of Mass Communication
Graduate School of Social Welfare
Graduate School of Law and Police
Graduate School of Arts
Graduate School of Computer Engineering and Aritifical Intelligence

Notable alumni 
Politicians
Cho Moo-je, former Supreme Court Judge
Kim Gi-hong, former Supreme Court Judge
Huh Sung-gwan (Former Minister of Government Administration and Home Affairs, Former Ministry of Oceans and Fisheries)
Bak Woonchan (Commissioner of the Korea Customs Service)
Yu Donghoon (Former Permanent Secretary of Culture and Sports)
Kim Doo-kwan (Congressman of Republic Of Korea, Cabinet of generation 20th, 21st)
Kim Woo-suk (Former Minister of Public Administration and Security)
Park Kwan-yong (Congressman of Republic Of Korea, Former Chairman of Congress)
Moon Daesung (Congressman of Republic Of Korea)
Bae Deokkwang (Congressman of Republic Of Korea)
Kim Doeup (Congressman of Republic Of Korea)
Kim Doo-kwan (Congressman of Republic Of Korea)
Kim Miae (Congressman of Republic Of Korea)
Yoon Jun Ho (Congressman of Republic Of Korea)

Soldiers
Nam Yeong-shin (Chief of Staff of the Republic of Korea Army)

Entrepreneurs
Kwak Sin-ae (CEO of Barunson Entertainment, Winner of 2020 Oscar Parasite (2019 film))
Kang Byung-joong (CEO of Nexen Tire)
Shin Chun-ho (Founder, former CEO of Nongshim)

Entertainers
Hanhae, singer (Phantom)
 Park Ji-il
Choi Young-joon
More information is in here - by Korean.

See also
List of colleges and universities in South Korea
Education in South Korea

References

External links 
  Dong-A University
 Dong-A University bulletin
 Dong-A Herald, English Newspaper, Dong-A University
 DongA DaeHakBo, Korean Newspaper, Dong-A University
 Library, Dong-A University
 Office of International Relations & Education, Dong-A University
 Dong-A University Museum
 Department of Archaeology and Art History
 Hospital, Dong-A University
 Hanlim Dormitory, Dong-A University
 Research Facility Center, Dong-A University
 Research Center for Industry-Academy Cooperation, Dong-A University
 Business Incubator Center, Dong-A University
 Intellectual Resource Development Center, Dong-A University
 Center for Teaching and Learning, Dong-A University
 Seokdang Museum of Dong-A University at Google Cultural Institute

 
Saha District
Seo District, Busan
Universities and colleges in Busan
Private universities and colleges in South Korea